In mathematics, a coercive function is a function that "grows rapidly" at the extremes of the space on which it is defined. Depending on the context
different exact definitions of this idea are in use.

Coercive vector fields 
A vector field f : Rn → Rn is called coercive if

where "" denotes the usual dot product and  denotes the usual Euclidean norm of the vector x.

A coercive vector field is in particular norm-coercive since
 for
, by
Cauchy–Schwarz inequality.
However a norm-coercive mapping
f : Rn → Rn
is not necessarily a coercive vector field. For instance
the rotation
f : R2 → R2, f(x) = (-x2, x1)
by 90° is a norm-coercive mapping which fails to be a coercive vector field since
 for every .

Coercive operators and forms
A self-adjoint operator  where  is a real Hilbert space, is called coercive if there exists a constant  such that

 

for all  in 

A bilinear form  is called coercive if there exists a constant  such that

for all  in 

 

for some self-adjoint operator  which then turns out to be a coercive operator. Also, given a coercive self-adjoint operator  the bilinear form  defined as above is coercive.

If  is a coercive operator then it is a coercive mapping (in the sense of coercivity of a vector field, where one has to replace the dot product with the more general inner product). Indeed,  for big  (if  is bounded, then it readily follows); then replacing  by  we get that  is a coercive operator.
One can also show that the converse holds true if  is self-adjoint. The definitions of coercivity for vector fields, operators, and bilinear forms are closely related and compatible.

Norm-coercive mappings
A mapping
 between two normed vector spaces
 and 
is called norm-coercive iff

.

The composition of a bijective proper map followed by a coercive map is coercive.

(Extended valued) coercive functions
An (extended valued) function

is called coercive if

A real valued coercive function 
is, in particular, norm-coercive. However, a norm-coercive function
 is not necessarily coercive.
but not coercive.

See also: radially unbounded functions

References
 
 

Functional analysis
General topology
Types of functions